"It's Alright" is the debut single by American contemporary R&B group Classic Example. It was co-written by The Boys members Khiry and Tajh Abdulsamad (who both appear toward the end of the song), and was produced by Khiry. The song originally only appeared on the Japanese release of the group's eponymous album but was later added to the US version of the album as well. It also appears as the closing track on the soundtrack to the film South Central.

"It's Alright" was the band's only song to chart on the Billboard Hot 100, peaking at #68 in 1992.

Chart positions

References

External links
 

1992 debut singles
Classic Example songs
Hollywood Records singles
1992 songs